Sardar Fareed is a Pakistani politician who had been a Member of the Provincial Assembly of Khyber Pakhtunkhwa, from June 2014 to May 2018.

Early life and education
He was born in 1963 in Malkot, Abbottabad District.

He received secondary education.

Political career

He was elected to the Provincial Assembly of Khyber Pakhtunkhwa as a candidate of Pakistan Muslim League (N) from Constituency PK-45 Abbottabad-II in by-election held in June 2014. He received 28,252 votes and defeated a candidate of Pakistan Tehreek-e-Insaf.

References

Living people
Khyber Pakhtunkhwa MPAs 2013–2018
1963 births
Pakistan Muslim League (N) politicians
People from Abbottabad District